Hakimpur Union is a union parishad of Shailkupa Upazila, in Jhenaidah District, Khulna Division of Bangladesh. There are 19 villages and 16 Mouzas in the union.

References

External links
 

Unions of Khulna Division
Unions of Shailkupa Upazila
Unions of Jhenaidah District